Payyoli is a municipality town on the Malabar Coast of Kozhikode district in the South Indian state of Kerala. Payyoli is famous for being the hometown of athlete PT Usha, who is nicknamed as the Payyoli Express. It is a town in Quilandy Taluk, Kozhikode District.

Transportation

 Nearest airport: Calicut International Airport and Kannur International Airport
 Nearest railway station: Payyoli 
 Nearest bus stand: Payyoli
 Nearest police station: Payyoli
 Nearest Govt. School: GVHSS Payyoli
Nearest Fire Station:Vadakara
Payyoli is situated besides the national highway (NH66) between Koyilandy and Vatakara.

Attractions
 Thikkodi drive in beach
 Thuraserikkadavu (island/thuruth)
 Velliyam kallu (a rock in river)
 Hochimin city ( Thurasserikkadavu)
 Iringal craft village (iringal)
 Shikkara boat service purakkad (Akalapuzha river)
 Kadalur light house (nandhi)
 Kovvapuram chira (fishing spot)
 Thurasserikkadavu Palam
 Perumal puram Siva temple
 Akalappuzha backwater view point
 Afrah Juma Masjid
 Kizhur Shiva kshethram
 Ayanikkad Juma Masjid
 Kottakkal Juma Masjid
 Kolavi palam beach & Turtle Cage
 Charichal Palli Makham (Payyoli Angadi)
 Payyoli Sreekurumba Bhagavati Temple
 Muthasshikkavu temple (Thurasserikkadavu)
 Micro wave view point –  from payyoli (iringath)
 Mini Goa - Beach near Kolavipalam beach
 Parapalli beach

Temples 

 Kizhur Maha Shiva kshethram
 Sree Iringal Kottayil Temple
 Sreekurumba Bhagavati Temple
 Payyoli Sree Mahavishnu Temple
 Sree Kurumba Temple
 Muthassikkavu temple ( Thurasserikkadavu)
 Vadakke puthukkot paradevatha temple (Thurasserikkadavu)
 Kunnath temple (kizhur junction )
 Parambil temple (Thachankunn)
 Palliyarkkal temple ( Thachankunn )
 Perumalpuram Shiva temple
 Kizhur ganapathi temple 
 Kommath temple ( kizhur )
 Nademmal Badrakali Temple
 Thevar Matam Sandhana Gopala Swami Vishnu Temple
 Chirakkal parambil sree bhagavathi temple
 Valappil Temple

Notable residents
 Olympian P. T. Usha, Indian runner known as "Payyoli express"

Transportation
Payyoli connects to other parts of India through NH 66.  The nearest airports are at Kannur and Kozhikode.  The nearest railway station is at Payyoli.  The national highway no.66 passes through Payyoli and the northern stretch connects to Mangalore, Goa and Mumbai. The southern stretch connects to Cochin and Trivandrum.

See also
 Nadapuram
 Thottilpalam
 Perambra
 Madappally
 Villiappally
 Memunda
 Iringal
 Mahe, Pondicherry
 Thikkodi
 Orkkatteri

External links

Koyilandy area